Empty Socks is a 1927 short animated film made by Walt Disney and Ub Iwerks that was considered a lost film until its rediscovery in Norway in 2014. The film stars Oswald the Lucky Rabbit.

Production background
The film was directed by Walt Disney while his studio was under contract by Winkler Productions. This short is considered Disney's first Christmas-themed cartoon. Mickey's Orphans (1931) is considered a remake of Empty Socks with a similar story line.

Rediscovery
In December 2014, an almost complete copy of the film, missing about 30 seconds, was discovered in Mo i Rana, Norway. Previously, the only known fragment was a 25-second segment housed at the Museum of Modern Art in New York City. The original short ran about 5:30. The print of Empty Socks was found with a copy of the Oswald cartoon Tall Timber (1928).

The print of Empty Socks belonged to a private individual, before being donated to the collection of the Norwegian Film Institute, which handed over its archive to the National Library of Norway. The library stores most of its documents in a high-security bunker in Mo i Rana.

On December 17, 2014, a digitized version of the recovered nitrate film was shown at the National Library of Norway, along with Tall Timber.

See also 
 List of Christmas films

References

External links
 
 
 Empty Socks at SilentEra

1927 animated films
1920s animated short films
1920s Disney animated short films
Oswald the Lucky Rabbit cartoons
Films directed by Walt Disney
Films directed by Ub Iwerks
American Christmas films
American black-and-white films
1920s rediscovered films
1927 films
Universal Pictures animated short films
Animated films about animals
1920s Christmas films
1927 short films
Rediscovered American films
1920s American films